The 2006 Critérium du Dauphiné Libéré was the 58th edition of the Critérium du Dauphiné Libéré cycle race and was held from 4 June to 11 June 2006.

American Levi Leipheimer of Team Gerolsteiner initially captured the overall title and the maillot jaune et bleu ahead of France's Christophe Moreau and Germany's Bernhard Kohl. Christophe Moreau (AG2R Prévoyance) secured the King of the Mountains competition and the combined classification (winner of the maillot bleu). The points classification for sprinters went to Spaniard Francisco Mancebo.  French team AG2R Prévoyance captured the team title.

Leipheimer was disqualified from the result in 2012, following a USADA investigation. After admitting that he had been doping from 1999 to 2007, Levi Leipheimer lost all his results, and no overall winner is recognised by the race organisation.

The 2006 edition featured a feast of climbing, and is considered the ideal race for the Tour de France contenders to hone their form. After eight challenging stages, it finished on June 11 – just under three weeks before the start of 'La Grande Boucle'.

Teams
Twenty-one teams, each with a maximum of eight riders, entered the race:

Route

Stages

Prologue
4 June 2006 — Annecy,  (ITT)

Stage 1
5 June 2006 — Annecy to Bourgoin-Jallieu,

Stage 2
6 June 2006 — Bourgoin-Jallieu to Saint-Galmier,

Stage 3
7 June 2006 — Bourg-de-Péage,  (ITT)

Stage 4
8 June 2006 — Tain-l'Hermitage to Le Mont-Ventoux,

Stage 5
9 June 2006 — Sisteron to Briançon,

Stage 6
10 June 2006 — Briançon to La Toussuire,

Stage 7
11 June 2006 — Saint-Jean-de-Maurienne to Grenoble,

Final standings

General classification

Points classification

Mountains classification

Combined classification

Jersey progress

Notes

References

Further reading

External links 
 

2006
2006 UCI ProTour
2006 in French sport
June 2006 sports events in France